In Mexico, the Secretariat of Economy (Spanish: Secretaría de Economía; abbreviated "SE") is the government department in charge of matters related to the economy. The Secretary of Economy is a member of the federal executive cabinet appointed by the President of the Republic.

Until 2000 the name of the Secretariat of Economy was the Secretariat for Commerce and Industry (Secofi) but that name was changed when Vicente Fox acceded to the Presidency.

Secretaries of Economy

Bruno Ferrari García de Alba, until November 30, 2012.
Idelfonso Guajardo, December 1, 2012-December 31, 2017.
Graciela Márquez Colín, January 1, 2018-January 4, 2020.
Tatiana Clouthier, January 5, 2021–October 7, 2022.
Raquel Buenrostro Sánchez, October 7, 2022.

References

External links
SE website

Economy

Economy